Gilia salticola is a species of flowering plant in the phlox family known by the common name salt gilia. It is native to the Sierra Nevada and Modoc Plateau of California and western Nevada, where it grows in volcanic and granitic soils.

Description
It is an annual herb. It grows up to 20 centimeters tall, its branching stem coated in cobwebby fibers and speckled with knob-tipped glandular hairs. The leaves gathered about the base of the stem are divided into deep, pointed lobes. The glandular inflorescence produces tubular flowers with ribbed sepals and yellow-throated lavender corollas. Flowers bloom May to June.

This is sometimes treated as a subspecies of Gilia leptantha.

References

External links
Jepson Manual Treatment - Gilia salticola
Gilia salticola - Photo gallery

salticola
Flora of California
Flora of Nevada
Flora of Oregon
Flora of the Great Basin
Flora of the Sierra Nevada (United States)
~
Endemic flora of the United States
Flora without expected TNC conservation status